The Armed Forces Medal for Heroic Deeds (Forsvarets medalje for edel dåd) was instituted in 1982 for heroic deeds done while on active service for the Norwegian Defence Force.

Description of the Medal

 The obverse of the medal features the Norwegian lion. 
 The reverse has the inscription "FORSVARET FOR EDEL DÅD" (The Defence For noble deed). 
 The ribbon is red with three yellow stripes.

See also
 Orders, decorations, and medals of Norway

References

External links
Norway: Armed Forces Medal for Heroic Deeds

Heroism
Awards established in 1982
1982 establishments in Norway